Run Towards the Danger is a 2022 Canadian essay collection by Sarah Polley, a former child star, director, and screenwriter. 

The six essays in the collection examine aspects of Polley's career on stage, screen, and on film detailing her roles in a Stratford Festival production of Alice Through the Looking Glass, as well as her breakout roles in The Adventures of Baron Munchausen and the TV series Road to Avonlea. The book also revealed for the first time that Polley had been a victim of Jian Ghomeshi who sexually and physically assaulted her when she was 16 and he was 28.

Summary
The book is composed of six essays:
Alice Collapsing, about Polley's time performing in the Stratford Festival production of Alice Through the Looking Glass and her battle with scoliosis.
The Woman Who Stayed Silent, about Polley's decision not to come forward about being sexually assaulted by Jian Ghomeshi.
High Risk, about Polley's high-risk pregnancy with her first daughter, Eve.
Mad Genius, about the danger and abuse she suffered while shooting The Adventures of Baron Munchausen at 9 years old. 
Dissolving the boundaries, about her trip to Prince Edward Island as an adult and reflecting on her unhappy time filming the TV series Road to Avonlea.
Run Towards the Danger, about a life changing concussion, the symptoms of which persevered for nearly 4 years.

Reception
The collection received a positive review from CBC which praised it for "riveting clarity".

References

2022 non-fiction books
Canadian essay collections